The General Aeroplane Company was Detroit's first commercial airplane builder. GAC built three types of aircraft during the First World War and operated a flying school. The aircraft were the Verville Flying Boat, the Gamma S biplane with floats (floatplane), and the Gamma L biplane with wheels. All had engine installations driving pusher propellers.

Founding
The key player in the company was 18-year-old Corwin Van Husen, who was supported by his guardian W. Howie Muir and other key players of Detroit and Grosse Pointe society. Other major investors included Fred and Russell Alger (who were also investors in the Wright Company and had demonstrated the Wright craft at the Grosse Pointe Country Club four years earlier), Herbert B. and Frank P. Book, Wm. Hendrie, and Jerome H. Remick.

In November 1915, the GAC hired 24-year-old Alfred V. Verville, an experienced airplane designer who would be a part of Detroit's aviation activities for years to come. Design of the company's first airplane, a two-passenger biplane flying boat, was completed in December and construction of the hull was begun by the Mayea Boat & Aeroplane Works.

The flying boat was flight tested during early 1916 and was advertised nationally for sale beginning in September. The U.S. Navy purchased the plane as a trainer, the first built-in-Detroit airplane sold for profit.

With U.S. involvement in World War One imminent, Verville began designing a military airplane, the Gamma. By November 1916, the prototype, a "pusher" type plane with the engine and propeller behind the crew, was fitted with seaplane floats and test flown from its base on the Detroit River. In the meantime, the leading industry magazine Aviation gave the GAC plane a boost by running a two-page story about the as yet unproved craft. For the winter the Gamma was fitted with wheels to replace the floats. On its maiden flight from frozen Lake St. Clair, a wind blew the Gamma into a snow bank, and it crashed. The pilot, William Bonney was unhurt, but the Gamma was destroyed.

Dissolution
On August 28, 1918, GAC ceased operations.

Aircraft
Verville flying boat (aka Beta), 1916
2 passenger, open cockpit, biplane flying boat
in the style of a Curtiss Model F
100 hp Curtiss OX-5 or Maximotor pusher
span: 38 ft length: 27 ft 8 in, load: 600 lb
Mahogany hull and wing floats constructed by Mayea Boat Co (Detroit), three-bladed prop, engine mounted under top wing
the Navy purchased the plane for use as a trainer. Two more similar military pushers and two twin-engine seaplanes were ordered in March 1917
Gamma S
biplane with floats (floatplane)
a two seater, open cockpit, flying boat, biplane with an 80 hp Le Rhône pusher engine
Gamma L
similar but with wheels
Twin floats were replaced with wheels for winter operations off the ice of Lake St. Clair

Gallery

See also

Detroit, Michigan
Alfred V. Verville

References

External links

http://aerofiles.com/_ga.html
https://web.archive.org/web/20120820155633/http://apps.detnews.com/apps/history/index.php?id=219

Vehicle manufacturing companies established in 1915
Defunct aircraft manufacturers of the United States
Alfred V. Verville
Privately held companies based in Michigan
Vehicle manufacturing companies disestablished in 1918
1915 establishments in Michigan
1918 disestablishments in Michigan
Defunct manufacturing companies based in Detroit